Denis Lucian Hrezdac (born 3 November 2001) is a Romanian professional footballer who plays as a midfielder for Progresul Pecica, on loan from UTA Arad.

Club career

UTA Arad

He made his Liga I debut for UTA Arad against Gaz Metan Medias on 2 April 2022.

References

External links
 
 

2001 births
People from Lugoj
Living people
Romanian footballers
Romania youth international footballers
Association football midfielders
Liga I players
Liga II players
Liga III players
FC UTA Arad players
CS Corvinul Hunedoara players